In algebraic geometry,  is said to be a multiplicative distance function over a field if it satisfies
 
 AB is congruent to A'B' iff 
 AB < A'B' iff

See also
Algebraic geometry
Hyperbolic geometry
Poincaré disc model
Hilbert's arithmetic of ends

References

Algebraic geometry